Soundaryapooja is a 1973 Indian Malayalam film, directed by B. K. Pottekkad. The film stars Madhu, Jayabharathi, Rani Chandra and Adoor Bhasi in the lead roles. The film had musical score by M. S. Baburaj.

Cast
Madhu
Jayabharathi
Rani Chandra
Adoor Bhasi
Sreelatha Namboothiri
T. R. Omana
Bahadoor
Balan K. Nair
Radhamani

Soundtrack
The music was composed by M. S. Baburaj and the lyrics were written by Mankombu Gopalakrishnan and Sreekumaran Thampi.

References

External links
 

1973 films
1970s Malayalam-language films